Ugunja is a constituency in Kenya. It is one of six constituencies in Siaya County.

References 

Constituencies in Siaya County